Caucasotachea vindobonensis is a species of medium-sized air-breathing land snail, a terrestrial pulmonate gastropod in the family Helicidae.

The scientific name is derived from the Celtic settlement Vindobona, now known as Vienna, the capital of Austria. This species was assigned to the genus Cepaea for a long time. However, molecular biologist research showed, that this species is not closely related to Cepaea, but belongs instead to the genus Caucasotachea.

Description
The right-coiled, globular  shell of C. vindobonensis is about 17–21 mm high and 20–25 mm broad with 5,5-6 whorls. The umbilicus is completely covered in adult specimens. The lip is always red-brown at the inner and outer side with a fine white stripe at its margin. This specific lip coloration allows to separate it from the conchological similar Cepaea hortensis (pure white lip) and Cepaea nemoralis (consistent dark brown lip), with which C. vindobonensis often co-occurs. The shell is whitish or yellowish, with about 5 brown stripes, the upper two are usually weak. The lowermost stripe is quite near to the covered umbilicus. There is a slight variation of shell colour within this species (see below). The animal itself is yellowish with grey tentacles.

Examples of variation in shell colour of C. vindobonensis:

Distribution and habitat
The distribution of this species is Pontic, Pannonian and Balkanian.
It occurs in Albania, Austria, Bulgaria, Bosnia and Herzegovina, Croatia, Czech Republic  (near threatened (NT) Its westernmost, but non-indigenous, record is from Western Bohemia.), Germany (reintroduced), Greece), Hungary, Italy, Latvia, Macedonia, Moldova, Poland, Romania, Slovakia, Slovenia, Russia (Rostov Oblast, Stavropol Krai, Krasnodar Krai, Moscow Region - non-indigenous distribution) and Ukraine. In 2021, introduced populations in the United States (New York State) and Canada (Quebec) were reported.

The original habitat of C. vindobonensis was most probably open forests in the Balkans, from where it spread over large parts of Central and Eastern Europe after the last glaciation. Nevertheless, it also dwells in several grassland habitats like meadows, steppe and ruderal areas, especially in the north of its distribution area. The highest vertical occurrence is about 1600 m asl in Southern Bulgaria.

Life cycle
All the following information originates from a Greek study.
 Because Greece is in the southernmost part of the distribution area, the phenology for this species might be quite different in the more northerly countries where it is found. According to the Greek study, C. vindobonensis becomes mature after its second year, and can reach a maximum life span of about 7 years. The reproductive period in Greece lasts from April to June, with a maximum in May. About 29-67 eggs are laid, having a diameter of about 3 mm, and the juveniles hatch out after 18 days. During hot summer days, these snails rest attached to leaves or the stems of tall plants. Hibernation commences at the end of October to the beginning of November, and the snails come out of hibernation in March.

References

External links

Helicidae
Gastropods described in 1828